Giulio Prosperetti (born 7 December 1946) is an Italian judge and labour law professor at the University of Rome Tor Vergata. He has been Judge of the Constitutional Court of Italy since 21 December 2015.

Career
Prosperetti was born in Perugia on 7 December 1946. In 1971 he obtained a degree in Jurisprudence under Giuseppe Guarino. He worked as a professor of labour law between 1985 and 1994 at the University of Cassino and Southern Lazio. Since 1994 he has been a professor of labour law at the University of Rome Tor Vergata. Prosperetti has been a judge at the Court of Appeal of Vatican City for more than twenty years.

On 16 December 2015, the Italian Parliament elected three candidates to the Constitutional Court of Italy: Augusto Barbera, Franco Modugno and  Prosperetti. The election was realized after 31 previous failed attempts. Properetti was the candidate of centrist politicians, he obtained 585 votes in favor. He was sworn in five days after his election.

Prosperetti was made a Grand Officer in the Order of Merit of the Italian Republic on 27 December 1997.

References

1946 births
Living people
Grand Officers of the Order of Merit of the Italian Republic
Judges of the Constitutional Court of Italy
Labour law scholars
People from Perugia
Academic staff of the University of Rome Tor Vergata